Schwenksville is a borough in Montgomery County, Pennsylvania, United States. The population was 1,385 at the 2010 census. It is notable for being located near the site of the Philadelphia Folk Festival. The borough was founded in 1684, when the Lenni-Lenape Indians ceded to William Penn the land along the Perkiomen Creek; it was incorporated in 1903. The borough was named for George Schwenk, whose son, Jacob Schwenk, served in George Washington's army.

The town was the inspiration for the protagonist in Catherine Gilbert Murdock's novel Dairy Queen (2006).

The Hall & Oates song "Perkiomen" was written about the Perkiomen Creek, which constitutes Schwenksville's eastern border. "Perkiomen" is Lenape for "muddy waters" and "where the cranberries grow."

Schwenksville is also the gateway to the Perkiomen Trail, a nineteen-mile section of the former Reading Railroad's Perkiomen Valley corridor. It now serves as a multi-use rail trail and was completed in 2003.

Geography
Schwenksville is located at  (40.256418, -75.465012).

Climate
The climate in this area is characterized by hot, humid summers and generally mild to cool winters.  According to the Köppen Climate Classification system, Schwenksville has a humid subtropical climate, abbreviated "Cfa" on climate maps.

History
General George Washington and the Continental Army camped in and around Schwenksville – September 26 to 29 and October 4 to 8, 1777 – prior to and immediately following the October 4 Battle of Germantown. Washington's headquarters probably was at the Henry Kelly House (demolished), just southwest of the town that he called "Pawling's Mill." The bulk of the Army camped on the opposite side of the Perkiomen Creek, at Pennypacker Mills.

The Borough was originally part of Perkiomen Township and home to the first copper mine in Pennsylvania. Ice harvesting was a major industry in the area. Several large icehouses were located along the creek, and ice was regularly shipped to Philadelphia. Mills devoted to grain and textiles were also very prominent which is evident by the existing historic structures. Its location along the Perkiomen Creek made the Borough a great summer resort community during its early existence, and Schwenksville was once home to The Perkiomen Inn, Spring Mountain House, and The Woodside Inn.

It was home to the Schwenksville Union School District until amalgamation with the Perkiomen Joint School District to form Perkiomen Valley School District in 1969.

Today the Borough is a residential community. Commercial and industrial businesses are located along the Main Street corridor. Schwenksville Elementary School; the Perkiomen Valley Branch of the Montgomery County-Norristown Public Library; the Schwenksville post office; two banks; three churches - Heidelberg United Church of Christ, Jerusalem Lutheran, and Eden Mennonite; and a 6.47 acre park along the Perkiomen Creek are located within the Borough.

The Pennypacker Mansion and Sunrise Mill are listed on the National Register of Historic Places.

Demographics

As of the 2010 census, the borough was 94.9% White, 2.5% Black or African American, 0.1% Native American, 0.7% Asian, 0.1% Native Hawaiian, and 1.4% were two or more races. 2.7% of the population were of Hispanic or Latino ancestry .

As of the census of 2000, there were 1,693 people, 626 households, and 326 families residing in the borough. The population density was 4,198.5 people per square mile (1,634.2/km2). There were 662 housing units at an average density of 1,641.7 per square mile (639.0/km2). The racial makeup of the borough was 94.21% White, 2.84% African American, 1.12% Asian, 0.06% Pacific Islander, 0.59% from other races, and 1.18% from two or more races. Hispanic or Latino of any race were 2.13% of the population.

There were 626 households, out of which 25.9% had children under the age of 18 living with them, 38.0% were married couples living together, 9.7% had a female householder with no husband present, and 47.8% were non-families. 40.1% of all households were made up of individuals, and 18.4% had someone living alone who was 65 years of age or older. The average household size was 2.13 and the average family size was 2.91.

In 2000, 17.7% of the population under the age of 18, with 26.5% from 18 to 24, 27.5% from 25 to 44, 15.2% from 45 to 64, and 13.1% who were 65 years of age or older. The median age was 30 years. For every 100 females there were 88.3 males. For every 100 females age 18 and over, there were 85.2 males.

The median income for a household in the borough was $44,514, and the median income for a family was $55,000. Males had a median income of $37,566 versus $31,200 for females. The per capita income for the borough was $19,679. About 3.3% of families and 5.4% of the population were below the poverty line, including 6.9% of those under age 18 and 12.2% of those age 65 or over.

Politics and government

Schwenksville has a city manager form of government with a mayor and a five-member borough council. In 2007, Democrats took control of the borough council for the first time in the borough's history. Currently, Council consists of 3 Democrats, 1 Libertarian, and 1 Independent.

The Borough also has active Activity and Historical Committees.  The goal of the Activity Committee is to plan and support various community activities to promote a sense of vitality in the community.  Accordingly, Community Day was started in 2009 to promote the businesses and non-profit organizations in Schwenksville with a fun community event. Committee members may plan other events through the year as well.  The Historic Committee was formed by the Borough for the purpose of exploring ways to save meaningful older buildings from being destroyed and to keep the rich history of Schwenksville intact for future generations.

The borough is part of the Fourth Congressional District (represented by Rep. Madeleine Dean), Pennsylvania's 147th Representative District (represented by Rep. Tracy Pennycuick) and the 24th State Senate District (represented by Sen. Bob Mensch).

Municipal services include: a volunteer fire department (closed in 2017 and merged with Lower Frederick due to lack of volunteers), and Parks & Recreation.  It is home to Meadow Park, which has a pavilion and provides a relaxing spot for people to walk and fish in the Creek.  The Borough intends to further develop the Park by adding a walking path and other activities as our funding and grant funding allow.  The Perkiomen Trail also runs through the Schwenksville borough, providing access to recreational activities along the Trail.

Transportation

Pennsylvania Route 29 and Pennsylvania Route 73 traverse the borough concurrently. The two routes follow Main Street on a general north-south alignment through the borough.

Education
Schwenksville is part of the Perkiomen Valley School District.

Residents are zoned to Schwenksville Elementary School, Middle School West, and Perkiomen Valley High School.

See also
Pennypacker Mills
Philadelphia Folk Festival
Perkiomen Trail
Perkiomen Creek

References

External links
History of Schwenksville

Populated places established in 1739
Boroughs in Montgomery County, Pennsylvania
1739 establishments in Pennsylvania